Greece participated with a team of 27 athletes (15 women and 12 men) at the 2007 World Championships in Athletics in Osaka, Japan.

Medals

Results

See also
Greece at the IAAF World Championships in Athletics

References

http://www.iaaf.org/athletes/greece/hrysopiyi-devetzi-137105

http://www.stivoz.com/forum/showthread.php?1215-%CE%A3%CF%85%CE%B3%CE%BA%CE%B5%CE%BD%CF%84%CF%81%CF%89%CF%84%CE%B9%CE%BA%CE%AC-%CE%A0%CE%B1%CE%B3%CE%BA-%CE%A0%CF%81%CF%89%CF%84%CE%B1%CE%B8%CE%BB-2007

Nations at the 2007 World Championships in Athletics
2007
World Championships in Athletics